Nordin Jbari (born 5 February 1975) is a Belgian former professional footballer who played as a forward.

Career
Jbari was born in Saint-Josse-ten-Noode, Belgium. Just like Sanharib Malki, he started his football career at local team SCUP Jette. Soon after, he went to the youth teams of Anderlecht. He made his début for the first team in 1995. Not getting too many chances at RSCA, Jbari decided to move to AA Gent, where he would only stay one year. During his period with Gent, Jbari would make his début as for Belgium national team. With this success, he went to Club Brugge, who were aiming more towards the top of the Belgian football competition. When his era at the blue and black side ended, Jbari decided to head for foreign football competitions.

Troyes AC was Jbari's next team. He stayed there until the winter break of the 2001–02 season, as he went on loan to the Greek team Aris Thessaloniki F.C. Jbari then returned to Troyes and stayed there for a six further months, until Ligue 2 side Grenoble Foot 38 bought him. But only six months later, Jbari would be an unattached football player.

Jbari then had a successful test period with Cercle Brugge, who had just promoted to the Jupiler League, right before the 2003–04 season, a.o. impressing and scoring in a friendly against Sint-Truiden. Nevertheless, he would sign a contract for one year due to him being prone to injuries. Jbari would become top scorer of the team, and thus raising the interest of other teams. At the end of the season, Jbari decided to go back to his former team AA Gent, who had offered him a better contract than Cercle. However, his move was not as successful as it was the first time he went to Gent. Jbari left and went to La Louvière only one year later. Sadly for Jbari, the team went bankrupt. He quit professional football and found a job.

References
 
 Cerclemuseum.be 

Living people
1975 births
People from Saint-Josse-ten-Noode
Belgian sportspeople of Moroccan descent
Belgian footballers
Footballers from Brussels
Association football forwards
Belgium international footballers
Belgian Pro League players
Ligue 1 players
Ligue 2 players
Super League Greece players
R.S.C. Anderlecht players
K.A.A. Gent players
Club Brugge KV players
ES Troyes AC players
Aris Thessaloniki F.C. players
Grenoble Foot 38 players
Cercle Brugge K.S.V. players
R.A.A. Louviéroise players
Belgian expatriate footballers
Belgian expatriate sportspeople in France
Expatriate footballers in France
Belgian expatriate sportspeople in Greece
Expatriate footballers in Greece